A locket is a type of jewelry pendant.

Locket may also refer to:

 Locket (film), a 1986 Indian Hindi-language film
 Locket (My Little Pony), a mainline pony in the My Little Pony franchise
 Locket Chatterjee (born 1974), Indian Bengali actress and politician

See also
 Lockets, a brand of throat lozenge
 Lockett, a surname
 The Locket (disambiguation)